Mata Leão is the fourth studio album by American heavy metal band Biohazard, released on June 25, 1996, by Warner Bros. Records, their second and final album for the label. Upon release, it charted at No. 170 on the Billboard 200, charting over 100 places lower than its predecessor, State of the World Address (which charted at No. 48), and was a commercial failure, leading Warner Bros. to drop the band from the label. Music videos for "Authority" and "A Lot to Learn" were released to promote the album.

The album was produced by Dave Jerden, best known for producing albums by Alice in Chains and Jane's Addiction. It was recorded by the band as a three-piece following the departure of guitarist Bobby Hambel in 1995. During the touring cycle for the album, former Helmet guitarist Rob Echiverria stepped in his place.

The words "mata leão" loosely translate into "lion killer" in Portuguese (also the name of a chokehold in Brazilian Jiu-Jitsu).

The album was released on vinyl, cassette and CD. Some versions of the CD came with an O-Card.

Track listing

Charts

Personnel 
Evan Seinfeld – bass, vocals
Billy Graziadei – lead and rhythm guitar, vocals
DJ Lethal – turntables
Danny Schuler – drums, percussion

References

Biohazard (band) albums
1996 albums
albums produced by Dave Jerden
Warner Records albums